Shaiza is a Tangkhul Naga surname. Notable people with the surname include:

 Hangmila Shaiza (1920–1997), Indian politician
 Kanrei Shaiza, Indian historian
 Rano M. Shaiza (1928–2015), Indian politician
 Yangmaso Shaiza (1923–1984), Indian politician

Surnames of Naga origin
Naga-language surnames